In molecular biology, Cyanobacterial non-coding RNAs are non-coding RNAs which have been identified in species of cyanobacteria. Large scale screens have identified 21 Yfr (cYanobacterial functional RNAs) in the marine cyanobacterium Prochlorococcus and related species such as Synechococcus. These include the Yfr1 and Yfr2 RNAs. In Prochlorococcus and Synechocystis, non-coding RNAs have been shown to regulate gene expression. NsiR4, widely conserved throughout the cyanobacterial phylum, has been shown to be involved in nitrogen assimilation control in Synechocystis sp. PCC 6803 and in the filamentous, nitrogen-fixing Anabaena sp. PCC 7120.

PsrR1 (photosynthesis regulatory RNA1), formerly known as Syr1 discovered in Synechocystis sp PCC 6803, is a regulatory  factor controlling photosynthetic  functions. Interactions between PsrR1 and the ribosome binding regions of several photosynthesis-related mRNAs have been confirmed. In particular, it has been show that psaL mRNA is processed by RNase E only in the presence of PsrR1.

See also
Bacillus subtilis BSR sRNAs
Bacterial small RNA
Brucella sRNA
Cyanobacteria
Cyanobacterial RNA thermometer
Escherichia coli sRNA
Mycobacterium tuberculosis sRNA
NsiR4
Pseudomonas sRNA
Yfr1 RNA
Yfr2 RNA

References

RNA
Non-coding RNA